Tomás Cabrita dos Santos Nunes Barroso (born 2 November 1990) is a Portuguese basketball player for S.L. Benfica and the Portugal national team.

Career
Born in Albufeira, Barroso developed his basketball skills from a young age, playing for his hometown club, Clube de Basquete de Albufeira. After five seasons, he moved to the same city rival, Imortal DC, but spent only two seasons, before scouts noted him and took him to Spain.

At 16 years of age, Barroso moved alone to Torrelodones, a small town,  from Madrid, competing for Espacio Torrelodones in the Liga EBA, plus on the Regional Under-18 Championship where they eliminated on the knockout stages by Real Madrid.

However, he sustained a knee injury that required surgery, so he opted to return to Portugal, and joined Benfica, which had approached him, as he finished his recovery.

Barroso started his professional career in 2010, and between choices to stay at Benfica; being loaned out to Spain; or to Ginásio da Figueira; he chose the latter, and joined them shortly after the FIBA Europe Under-20 Championship. A year later, he returned to Benfica, and helped the Reds won four league titles in a row, plus more than ten other cups, also debuting in European competitions, in the 2014–15 EuroChallenge. For the 2015–16 season, he replaced Diogo Carreira as team captain.

Honours
Benfica
 Portuguese League: 2011–12, 2012–13, 2013–14, 2014–15, 2016–17, 2021-22
 Portuguese Cup: 2013–14, 2014–15, 2015–16, 2016–17
 League Cup: 2012–13, 2013–14, 2014–15, 2016–17, 2017–18
 Portuguese Supercup: 2011, 2012, 2013, 2014, 2015, 2017
 António Pratas Trophy: 2012, 2013, 2014, 2016

References

External links
 Eurobasket Profile

1990 births
Living people
People from Albufeira
Point guards
Portuguese men's basketball players
S.L. Benfica basketball players
Sportspeople from Faro District